HMS Fox was a 46-gun Fifth-rate launched in 1829, converted to a screw frigate in 1856, and broken up in 1882.

Second Anglo-Burmese War 

She took part in the Second Anglo-Burmese War.

Notes

External links
 

1829 ships
Fifth-rate frigates of the Royal Navy
Ships built in Southampton
Captured ships